Paulpietersburg is a small town in KwaZulu-Natal, South Africa. It was established in 1888 and was then part of the Transvaal Republic. It was named after then President Paul Kruger and Voortrekker hero Piet Joubert.

Town 72 km south of Piet Retief and 151 km north-east of Dundee. It was established in 1888, proclaimed a township in 1910, and attained municipal status in 1958. Named after President Paul Kruger and General Piet Joubert, it was first called Paulpietersrust, then Paulpietersdorp, and Paulpietersburg in 1896.

Notable residents 
 Hans Meyer

References

Populated places in the eDumbe Local Municipality
Populated places established in 1888
Populated places founded by Afrikaners